Tyler Wright (born April 6, 1973) is a Canadian former professional ice hockey player. He played in 613 NHL games with the Edmonton Oilers, Pittsburgh Penguins, Columbus Blue Jackets, and Mighty Ducks of Anaheim. He currently serves as director of Player Personal /director of amateur scouting for the Edmonton Oilers.

Wright was born in Canora, Saskatchewan, but grew up in Kamsack, Saskatchewan.

Playing career
Wright was drafted 12th overall in the 1991 NHL Entry Draft by the Edmonton Oilers. As a junior with the Swift Current Broncos in 1989-90 he scored 32 points as a rookie. In 1990-91, he improved his offensive production, scoring 41 goals and 92 points in 66 games. In the 1991-92 season, he netted 36 goals and 82 points in 63 games.

After being drafted by the Oilers, Wright played parts of two seasons in Edmonton (1992–93 and 1993–94) but ultimately spent most of his time with their AHL team, Cape Breton Oilers.

On June 22, 1996, Wright was acquired by the Pittsburgh Penguins for a 7th-round draft pick (Brandon Lafrance) and subsequently played 45 games with the Penguins during the 1996-97 season, registering 2 goals and 2 assists. In 1997-98, he joined the NHL ranks full-time and played all 82 games for the Penguins. He helped his team win the Northeast Division title and then made his playoff debut.

In 1998-99, he played 61 regular-season games for the Penguins. The following year he dressed for 50 games and scored 12 goals and 22 points. In the 1999 playoffs, he scored four points in eleven games as the Penguins reached the second round. On April 21, he scored his first career playoff goal against the Washington Capitals.

On June 23, 2000, Wright was selected in the 2000 NHL Expansion Draft by the newly formed Columbus Blue Jackets. In his first season with his new team, he scored 16 goals and 32 points and developed into an on ice leader for the Blue Jackets. Since 1987–88, there have been 94 hat tricks scored by a goal (i) at even strength, (ii) on the power play, and (iii) on the penalty kill, by a total of 75 different players. Wright scored two of these 94 hat tricks, with the first coming on March 16, 2001, against the Atlanta Thrashers and his second coming on October 27, 2002, against the Los Angeles Kings.

During the NHL lockout, Wright played with Swiss team EHC Biel in the second Swiss division.

After four seasons in Columbus, Wright was dealt to the Mighty Ducks of Anaheim on November 15, 2005, in a deal that saw Sergei Fedorov join the Blue Jackets.

International play

On the international stage, Wright represented Canada at the 1992 and 1993 World Junior Championships. At the 1993 tournament, he was an alternate captain and helped Canada win the gold medal and was a member of Canada's World Championship team in 2002.

Post-retirement
In July 2007, Wright rejoined the Columbus Blue Jackets organization in a front office position when he was named a development coach for the club. His duties included working with prospects and young players throughout the organization, and assisting with the development of prospects within the professional minor leagues, various major junior leagues, and college level.

On July 1, 2013, Wright resigned from the Blue Jackets. On July 10, 2013, he was named the director of amateur scouting for the Detroit Red Wings.  On July 11, 2019, it was announced that Wright would depart the Detroit Red Wings and join new GM Ken Holland in Edmonton.  The two previously worked together for the last six seasons with the Detroit Red Wings.

Career statistics

Regular season and playoffs

International

References

External links

1973 births
EHC Basel players
EHC Biel players
Canadian ice hockey centres
Canadian ice hockey right wingers
Canadian people of English descent
Cape Breton Oilers players
Cleveland Lumberjacks players
Columbus Blue Jackets coaches
Columbus Blue Jackets players
Columbus Blue Jackets scouts
Detroit Red Wings scouts
Edmonton Oilers draft picks
Edmonton Oilers players
Ice hockey people from Saskatchewan
Living people
Mighty Ducks of Anaheim players
National Hockey League first-round draft picks
People from Canora, Saskatchewan
Pittsburgh Penguins players
Swift Current Broncos players
Wilkes-Barre/Scranton Penguins players
Canadian expatriate ice hockey players in Switzerland
Canadian ice hockey coaches